The American invasion of the island of Okinawa, codenamed Operation Iceberg, took place 1 April 1945. The Japanese military was determined to inflate a casualty rate so high that the U.S. government would choose not to invade the Japanese home islands. To this end, the southern portion of the island had been covered with the most extensive system of fortifications and fields of fire yet encountered in the Pacific War.

The island was not declared secure until 22 June, a period of 82 days. Lieutenant General Simon Bolivar Buckner Jr. became the highest ranking U.S. military officer to be killed in action in the Second World War.

American forces 

 US Tenth Army
Lieutenant General Simon Bolivar Buckner Jr., USA (KIA 18 Jun)
Major General Roy S. Geiger, USMC (18 Jun thru 23 Jun)
General Joseph W. Stilwell, USA (from 23 Jun)

Northern Landing Beaches 
 III Amphibious Corps (Embarked in Task Force 53)
Major General Roy S. Geiger, USMC
Chief of Staff: Brigadier General Merwin H. Silverthorn, USMC
Chief of Corps Artillery: Brigadier General David R. Nimmer, USMC
 Left Beaches:
  6th Marine Division (24,356 officers and enlisted)
 Division Commander: Major General Lemuel C. Shepherd, Jr., USMC
 Asst. Division Commander: Brigadier General William T. Clement, USMC
 22nd Marine Regiment (Colonel Merlin F. Schneider, USMC) – Green Beaches
 4th Marine Regiment (Colonel Alan Shapley, USMC) – Red Beaches
 29th Marine Regiment (Colonel Victor Bleasdale, USMC) – Reserve
 15th Marine Regiment (Artillery) (Colonel Robert B. Luckey, USMC)
 Right Beaches:
  1st Marine Division (26,274 officers and enlisted)
 Division Commander: Major General Pedro A. del Valle, USMC
 Asst. Division Commander: Brigadier General Louis R. Jones, USMC
 7th Marine Regiment (Colonel Edward W. Snedeker, USMC) – Blue Beaches
 5th Marine Regiment (Colonel John H. Griebel, USMC) – Yellow Beaches
 1st Marine Regiment (Colonel Arthur T. Mason, USMC) – Reserve
 11th Marine Regiment (Artillery) (Colonel Wilburt S. Brown, USMC)
 1st Provisional Antiaircraft Artillery Group
 Commanding officer: Colonel Kenneth W. Benner, USMC

Southern Landing Beaches 
 XXIV Army Corps (Embarked in Task Force 55)
Major General John R. Hodge, USA
 Left Beaches:
  7th Infantry ("Bayonet") Division (21,929 officers and enlisted)
 Division Commander: Major General Archibald V. Arnold, USA
 17th Infantry Regiment – Purple Beaches
 32nd Infantry Regiment – Orange Beaches
 184th Infantry Regiment – Reserve
 48th, 49th, 57th Field Artillery Battalions (105mm) 
 31st Field Artillery Battalion (155mm)
 Right Beaches:
  96th Infantry ("Deadeye") Division (22,330 officers and enlisted)
 Division Commander: Major General James L. Bradley, USA
 381st Infantry Regiment – White Beaches
 383rd Infantry Regiment – Brown Beaches
 382nd Infantry Regiment – Reserve
 361st, 362nd, 921st Field Artillery Battalions (105mm)
 363rd Field Artillery Battalion (155mm)
 Reserve:
  27th Infantry ("New York") Division (16,143 officers and enlisted)
 Division Commander: Major General George W. Griner, Jr., USA
 105th Infantry Regiment – landed L+8
 106th Infantry Regiment – landed L+8
 165th Infantry Regiment – landed L+8
 104th, 105th, 249th Field Artillery Battalions (105mm) 
 106th Field Artillery Battalion (155mm)

Western Islands (Ie Shima, etc.) 
 Embarked in Task Group 51.1
  77th Infantry ("Statue of Liberty") Division (20,981 officers and enlisted)
 Division Commander: Major General Andrew D. Bruce, USA
 306th Infantry Regiment – landed Green Beach 17 Apr
 305th Infantry Regiment – landed Red Beaches 1 & 2 17 Apr
 307th Infantry Regiment – landed Red Beaches 3 & 4 17 Apr
 304th, 305th, 902nd Field Artillery Battalions (105mm)
 306th Field Artillery Battalion (155mm) 
 One Marine BLT

Air Forces 
 Tactical Air Force, Tenth Army
 Major General Francis P. Mulcahy, USMC
 Major General Louis E. Woods, USMC

Japanese forces

Thirty-second Army
Lieutenant General Mitsuru Ushijima (seppuku 22 June)
Approx. 67,000 men under arms, incl. 5,000 Okinawan conscripts
 24th Division
 Lt. Gen. Tatsumi Amamiya (KIA 30 June)
 22nd Infantry Regiment
 32nd Infantry Regiment
 89th Infantry Regiment
 62nd Division
 Lt. Gen. Takeo Fujioka (suicide 22 June)
 63rd Brigade
 67th Brigade
 44th Independent Mixed Brigade
 Maj. Gen. Suzuki Shigeji (died 22 June)

Notes

References

Bibliography 
 

1945 in Japan
Battles of World War II involving Japan
Battles of World War II involving the United States
History of Okinawa Prefecture
Japan campaign
Murder–suicides in Asia
Battle of Okinawa
United States Armed Forces in Okinawa Prefecture
United States Marine Corps in World War II
World War II invasions
World War II operations and battles of the Pacific theatre
Invasions of Japan
Invasions by the United States
Amphibious operations of World War II
April 1945 events in Asia
May 1945 events in Asia
June 1945 events in Asia
World War II orders of battle